The BT-4 is a pressure-fed liquid rocket engine designed and  manufactured by IHI Aerospace of Japan. It was originally developed for the LUNAR-A project, but it has been used as a liquid apogee engine in some geostationary communications satellite based on the Lockheed Martin A2100 and GEOStar-2 satellite buses. It has also been used on the HTV and Cygnus automated cargo spacecraft.

History
During the 1970s, Ishikawajima-Harima Heavy Industries had built under license the Rocketdyne MB-3 for the N-I rocket, for which it had also developed the second stage attitude control system. In the 1980s it also developed the thrusters for ETS-4 (Kiku-3), the first to be built in Japan. In 2000 it acquired and merged with the aerospace division of Nissan and became IHI Aerospace.

IHI Aerospace started developing the BT-4 for the later cancelled LUNAR-A mission to the moon. While the mission was cancelled, the thruster has seen success as a liquid apogee engine on the Lockheed Martin A2100 and Orbital ATK GEOStar-2 platforms. Two other Orbital ATK products that use the BT-4 due to their leverage of the GEOStar-2 platform are the Cygnus spacecraft and the Antares Bi-propellant Third Stage (BTS).

The use on the A2100 platform has allowed IHI to export the BT-4 even to American military programs such programs as the MUOS and AEHF.

On March 9, 2006, IHI Aerospace announced that the AEHF-2 BT-4 engine had successfully performed its mission, unlike AEHF-1's.
On November 29, 2010 IHI Aerospace announced that it had received and order from Lockheed Martin of four BT-4 engines for AEHF-4, MUOS-4, MUOS-5 and Vinasat-2. With this order, it achieved its 100th-unit foreign engine export since it started selling abroad in 1999.

For the HTV project, IHI developed a new version, the HBT-5, which enabled them to replace the American R-4D from the third flight onward.

On October 3, 2013, with the successful berthing of the Cygnus Orb-D1 mission, IHI announced that the propulsion was based on their 500N Delta-Velocity Engines.

In January 2018, a BT-4 kick motor was used on the GovSat-1 geosynchronous commsat flight.

Versions
The BT-4 is a family that has been used as liquid apogee engine, orbital maneuvering engine and as a thruster. Known variations:

BT-4 (450N): Used mainly as LAE, it burns Hydrazine/N2O4 in a 1.69 O/F ratio. As of 2014, it had a demonstrated life of 32,850 seconds.
As of 2014, it had a demonstrated life of 15,000 seconds.
Used in HTV-3 and since HTV-5 onward.
SELENE OME: Based on the DRTS Liquid apogee engine, the SELENE Orbital Maneuvering Engine burned a Hydrazine/MON-3 mixture.

References 

Rocket engines using hypergolic propellant
Rocket engines using the pressure-fed cycle